The Roman Catholic Archdiocese of Bouaké is the Metropolitan See for the Ecclesiastical province of Bouaké in Côte d'Ivoire.

History
 1951.05.17: Established as Apostolic Vicariate of Bouaké from the Apostolic Vicariate of Abidjan
 1955.09.14: Promoted as Diocese of Bouaké 
 1994.12.19: Promoted as Metropolitan Archdiocese of Bouaké

Special churches
The seat of the archbishop is Cathédrale Sainte Thérèse in Bouaké.

Bishops

Ordinaries
Vicar Apostolic of Bouaké (Roman rite)
 Bishop André-Pierre Duirat, S.M.A. (1951.10.26 – 1955.09.14); see below
 Bishops of Bouaké (Roman rite)
 Bishop André-Pierre Duirat, S.M.A. (1955.09.14 – 1973.05.17); see above
 Bishop Vital Komenan Yao (1973.05.17 – 1994.12.19); see below
 Metropolitan Archbishops of Bouaké (Roman rite)
 Archbishop Vital Komenan Yao (1994.12.19 – 2006.09.22); see above
 Archbishop Paul-Siméon Ahouanan Djro, O.F.M. (since 2006.09.22)

Coadjutor archbishop
Paul-Siméon Ahouanan Djro, O.F.M. (2006)

Auxiliary Bishop
Jacques Assanvo Ahiwa (2020-

Other priest of this diocese who became bishop
Auguste Nobou, appointed Bishop of Korhogo in 1971

Suffragan Dioceses
 Abengourou
 Bondoukou
 Yamoussoukro

See also
 Roman Catholicism in Côte d'Ivoire
 List of Roman Catholic dioceses in Côte d'Ivoire

Sources
 GCatholic.org

Bouake
Bouaké
Gbêkê
A